Robert Bosch (23 September 1861 – 12 March 1942) was a German industrialist, engineer and inventor, founder of Robert Bosch GmbH.

Biography

Bosch was born in Albeck, a village to the northeast of Ulm in southern Germany as the eleventh of twelve children. His parents came from a class of well-situated farmers from the region. His father, a freemason, was unusually highly educated for someone of his class, and placed special importance on a good education for his children. One of his brothers  was Carl Friedrich Alexander Bosch (1843–1904), the father of Nobel laureate Carl Bosch.

From 1869 to 1876, Bosch attended the Realschule (secondary-technical school) in Ulm, and then took an apprenticeship as a precision mechanic.

After his school and practical education, Bosch spent a further seven years working at diverse companies in Germany, the United States (for Thomas Edison in New York), and the UK (for the German firm Siemens). On 15 November 1886, he opened his own "Workshop for Precision Mechanics and Electrical Engineering" in Stuttgart. A year later, he made a decisive improvement to an unpatented magneto ignition device made by the engine manufacturer Deutz, providing his first business success. The purpose of the device was to generate an electric spark to ignite the air–fuel mixture in a stationary engine.  In 1897, Bosch was the first to adapt a magneto to a vehicle engine. In doing so, he solved one of the greatest technical problems faced by the nascent automotive industry. The invention of the first commercially viable high-voltage spark plug as part of a magneto-based ignition system by Robert Bosch's engineer Gottlob Honold in 1902 was a key stage in the development of the internal combustion engine.

Before the 19th century ended, Bosch expanded his operations beyond Germany. The company established a sales office in the UK in 1898, and other European countries soon after. The first sales office and the first factory in the U.S. were opened in 1906 and 1910 respectively. By 1913, the company had branch operations in America, Asia, Africa, and Australia, and was generating 88% of its sales outside Germany. In rapid succession in the years following the First World War, Bosch launched innovations for the motor vehicle, including diesel fuel injection in 1927. In the 1920s the global economic crisis caused Bosch to begin a rigorous program of modernization and diversification in his company. In only a few years' time, he succeeded in turning his company from a small automotive supplier into a multinational electronics group.

From the beginning, Bosch was greatly concerned about promoting occupational training. Prompted by his awareness of social responsibility, he was one of the first industrialists in Germany to introduce the eight-hour work day, followed by other social benefits for his associates. Robert Bosch did not wish to profit from the armaments contracts awarded to his company during WWI. Instead, he donated several million German marks to charitable causes. A hospital that he gave to the city of Stuttgart opened in 1940.

In the 1920s and 1930s, Robert Bosch was politically active. As a liberal businessman, he sat on a number of economic committees. He devoted a great deal of energy and money to the cause of bringing about reconciliation between Germany and France. He hoped this reconciliation would bring about lasting peace in Europe and lead to the creation of a European economic area.

Third Reich

The Nazi regime in Germany brought Bosch's peacemaking efforts to an abrupt end. The Bosch company accepted armaments contracts and employed an estimated 20,000 slaves (including some 1200 concentration camp inmates who were "brutally abused at the Langenbielau plant") during the war. Meanwhile, Bosch supported the resistance against Adolf Hitler and together with his closest associates saved victims of Nazi persecution from deportation.

On his eightieth birthday, Bosch was awarded the title "Pionier der Arbeit" (Pioneer of Labor) by Hitler and when he died a year later, he was afforded a state funeral by the Third Reich.

Bosch was keenly interested in agricultural issues and owned a farm south of Munich. He was also a passionate hunter. When he died, he was survived by four children from two marriages. A son from his first marriage died in 1921 following a protracted illness.

In 1937, Bosch had restructured his company as a private limited company (close corporation). He had established his last will and testament in which he stipulated that the earnings of the company should be allocated to charitable causes. Also, his will sketched the outlines of the corporate constitution, which was formulated by his successors in 1964 and is still valid today.

He was inducted into the Automotive Hall of Fame in 1984.

See also

 Robert Bosch GmbH
 Robert Bosch Stiftung
 Robert-Bosch-Hospital
 German inventors and discoverers
 Bosch Fernseh

References

Bibliography
 Robert Bosch: The prevention of future crises in the world economic  system. London, Constable, 1937 (German edition 1932)
 Theodor Heuss: Robert Bosch – his life and achievements. Transl. by Susan Gillespie. New York, Holt, 1994. 
 Hans-Erhard Lessing: Robert Bosch. Reinbek 2007 (in German).

External links
 
 Robert Bosch at the Automotive Hall of Fame

1861 births
1942 deaths
People from Langenau
People from the Kingdom of Württemberg
German automotive pioneers
German company founders
19th-century German businesspeople
20th-century German businesspeople
19th-century German inventors
German industrialists
Robert Bosch GmbH